Despite its limited geographical space, San Francisco, California is home to a multitude of colleges and universities.

Public colleges and universities include:
City College of San Francisco, one of the largest community colleges in the country; in Ingleside, with several extension campuses
San Francisco State University, in the southwest corner of the city near Lake Merced
University of California, Hastings College of the Law, located downtown at its Civic Center
University of California, San Francisco, primarily a graduate level health-sciences school, located in the Parnassus Heights/Inner Sunset neighborhood and in  Mission Bay, San Francisco, California.

Private colleges and universities:
Academy of Art University
Alliant International University, formerly California School of Professional Psychology
Art Institute of California - San Francisco, a private campus which focuses on video game and design-based education (interior, fashion etc.) 
Arthur A. Dugoni School of Dentistry, part of the University of the Pacific
California College of the Arts, an Oakland-based school
California Institute of Integral Studies, in downtown San Francisco
DeVry University
The Fashion Institute of Design and Merchandising (FIDM)
Golden Gate University, a private, nonsectarian, coeducational university located in the Financial District of Downtown San Francisco
Heald College, in the Financial District
Hult International Business School (Hult San Francisco Campus)
Minerva Schools at KGI
New College of California, now defunct, was located in the Mission District
Presidio Graduate School
San Francisco Art Institute
San Francisco Conservatory of Music
San Francisco Law School
San Francisco School of Digital Filmmaking
Saybrook University
 University of San Francisco, Jesuit-run; located on Lone Mountain
Wharton School of the University of Pennsylvania, in the Financial District

See also
List of colleges and universities in California

 
San Francisco
Colleges and Universities
Colleges and universities in San Francisco